Tommy Robredo was the defending champion but chose not to defend his title.

Bernabé Zapata Miralles won the title after defeating Jiří Lehečka 6–3, 6–2 in the final.

Seeds

Draw

Finals

Top half

Bottom half

References

External links
Main draw
Qualifying draw

Poznań Open - 1
2021 Singles